Beautiful Thing(s) may refer to:

Music

Albums 
 Beautiful Thing (Alexis Taylor album) or the title song, 2018
 Beautiful Thing (Ben Vaughn album) or the title song, 1987
 A Beautiful Thing: Idles Live at le Bataclan, by Idles, 2019
 Beautiful Things (album), by Anthony Green, 2012
 Beautiful Things or the title song, by Gungor, 2010

Songs 
 "Beautiful Thing" (Do song), 2006
 "Beautiful Thing" (The Stone Roses song), 2016
 "Beautiful Thing", by Haven, 2001
 "Beautiful Thing", by Sister Hazel from Fortress, 2000
 "Beautiful Things" (Ai song), 2012
 "Beautiful Things" (Andain song), 2003
 "Beautiful Things", by the 3Ds, 1993
 "Beautiful Things", by Roxette from Have a Nice Day, 1999
 "Beautiful Things", composed by Leslie Bricusse from the film Doctor Dolittle, 1967

Theatre and film 
 Beautiful Thing (play), a 1993 play by Jonathan Harvey
 Beautiful Thing (film), a 1996 film adaptation of the play
 Beautiful Things, winner of the Next:Wave Award at the 2018 Copenhagen International Documentary Festival

Other uses
 "Beautiful Thing" (audio drama), an episode of the Doctor Who audio series Jago & Litefoot
 Beautiful Things (book), a 2021 memoir by Hunter Biden

See also 
 It's a Beautiful Thing (disambiguation)